Nozomi may refer to:

Nozomi (given name)
Nozomi (book), a photobook by Nozomi Sasaki 
Nozomi Entertainment, the anime license and distribution division of retailer The Right Stuf International
Nozomi (spacecraft), a failed Mars space probe 
Nozomi (train), a high-speed train service in Japan
Sony Xperia S, a Sony smartphone codenamed Nozomi

See also
Nozomi Witches, a manga series by Toshio Nobe